Leszek Martewicz (born 4 January 1955) is a Polish fencer. He competed in the team foil event at the 1976 Summer Olympics.

References

1955 births
Living people
Polish male fencers
Olympic fencers of Poland
Fencers at the 1976 Summer Olympics
Sportspeople from Gdańsk